Rough Trade is a group of independent record shops in the United Kingdom and the United States with headquarters in London.

The first Rough Trade shop was opened in 1976 by Geoff Travis in the Ladbroke Grove district of West London. Travis reportedly took the name from the Canadian art punk/new wave band Rough Trade. In 1978, the shop spawned Rough Trade Records, which became the label of bands from The Smiths to The Libertines. In 1982, the two separated and the shop remains an independent entity from the label, although links between the two are strong. At the same time, the shop moved from its original location on Kensington Park Road round the corner to Talbot Road. In 1988, a shop opened in Neal's Yard, Covent Garden. At various times there were also shops in San Francisco (on Grant St., then Sixth Street, then Haight Street and finally 3rd and Townsend Streets), Tokyo and Paris. They were eventually closed following the rise of music sales on the Internet. Rough Trade replaced these stores with an online music store. In 2007, it also opened in Dray Walk, Brick Lane, in east London.

Stock
Musically, Rough Trade specialises in the post-punk genre, but carries items through a range of genres, mostly within the alternative or underground scenes. Recently the shop has released several compilation albums, each focusing on an individual genre such as indie-pop, electronica, country, singer songwriter, rock and roll and post-punk. Every January since 2003, it has released a compilation putting together the best (in the opinion of the shops' staff) of the previous year's music entitled Counter Culture. In 2007, there was also the release of Counter Culture 76, reflecting the music of year the shop opened. It also released a 4-CD box set for its 25th anniversary in 2001, and a special collection of songs chosen by customers was released to celebrate the 30th anniversary in 2006.

Rough Trade, Ladbroke Grove
The store was the first Rough Trade shop and opened at 202 Kensington Park Road in 1976. It later moved to 130 Talbot Road.

Rough Trade Neal's Yard, Covent Garden
The Covent Garden shop opened in 1988 and was located in the basement of Slam City Skates in Neal's Yard. It closed down shortly before Rough Trade East opened in 2007.

Rough Trade East, Brick Lane

In July 2007, Rough Trade opened a  shop in Brick Lane. The shop, called "Rough Trade East", is located in the former Truman's Brewery in a courtyard off Brick Lane and puts on free music gigs on a high-spec stage, allowing for an audience of 200. The shop sells some chart titles, music from bands without distribution deals and a quarter of the merchandise is vinyl. Every item, vinyl and CD, has a written description to encourage browsing and discovery. Designed by David Adjaye the shop has a fair trade café and a "snug" area with iMacs, sofas and desks.

In the first half of 2007, CD sales had fallen by 10 percent and in the month of the shop opening the UK music chain Fopp went into administration. Stephen Godfroy, the store director, said, "I don't think music belongs on the high street as the high street exists at the moment", and that retailers, not the consumers, are to blame for the decline in sales. In September 2007, sales in Rough Trade East had exceeded expectations by 20 percent. Stephen Godfroy explained that "You've got to create an environment where people want to spend time. It's got to be complementary to modern lifestyles, distinctive and competitive on pricing and have confidence in recommending exciting new products and not rely on chart product." Rough Trade Shops has investors from XL Recordings and Beggars Banquet Records causing some to question its independence.

Rough Trade New York
In April 2012, it was announced that Rough Trade would be opening a store in the Williamsburg neighbourhood of Brooklyn, in partnership with Bowery Presents. The store, including a performance space and a coffee counter, was initially scheduled to open in late 2012. The store opened on 25 November 2013, becoming the biggest record store in New York City. Rough Trade closed the Brooklyn store closed in March 2021, moving to a new, smaller location at 30 Rockefeller Plaza in June.

Rough Trade Nottingham
Rough Trade opened a store on Broad Street in Nottingham's Lace Market area in 2014. The store has a bar and performance area on the first floor.

See also
Rough Trade Records
Cassette culture

References

External links

Rough Trade Shops Compilations – Discography

Shop
Independent stores
Music retailers of the United Kingdom
1976 establishments in England